K22 may refer to:

Roads 
 K-22 (Kansas highway)
 K-22 (1926–1931 Kansas highway)
 K-22 (1930–1938 Kansas highway)

Vehicles 
 Changhe Freedom K22, a Chinese pickup truck
 , a K-class submarine of the Royal Navy
 , a corvette of the Swedish Navy

Other uses 
 K-22 trailer, part of the American SCR-270 radar system
 Big Sandy Regional Airport, in Martin County, Kentucky
 Smith & Wesson Model K-22, a revolver
 Symphony No. 5 (Mozart), K. 22, by Wolfgang Amadeus Mozart
 The k22 family of uniform polytopes